Claude Meisch (born 27 November 1971, in Pétange) is a Luxembourg politician with a degree in financial mathematics from Trier university. Meisch was appointed Minister of Education in 2013 in the government of Xavier Bettel. He has been a member of the Chamber of Deputies since 1999 and Mayor of Differdange since 2002.  He was  President of the Democratic Party (DP) from 2004 until 2013, of which he has been a member since 1994.

Born in Pétange, in the south-west of the country, Meisch attended the town's Lycée technique Mathias-Adam, before studying at the University of Trier, in Germany. After graduating, he worked for the private Banque de Luxembourg.  Meisch was Vice-President of the Democratic and Liberal Youth, the DP's youth wing, from 1995 until 2000.

Meisch ran for the Chamber of Deputies, to represent Sud, in the 1999 election.  Meisch finished sixth amongst DP candidates, with the top four being elected.  However, the election saw the DP become kingmakers, giving them enough leverage over the Christian Social People's Party (CSV) to allow them to appoint seven Democratic deputies, including Henri Grethen and Eugène Berger, to the new government. Grethen insisted that Berger be appointed along with him, specifically so that Meisch could enter the Chamber.  With Grethen and Berger required to vacate their seats to take up their government positions, Meisch filled in the gap and entered the Chamber of Deputies on 12 August 1999.

In the 2004 legislative election, Meisch was re-elected to the Chamber directly, placing second amongst DP candidates in an election that saw the party's representation from Sud reduced from four to two.  The result was bad for the DP across the country, losing five seats and seeing them replaced as the Christian Social People's Party's (CSV) coalition partners by the LSAP.  After the election, Lydie Polfer resigned as DP President, having served the term limit imposed by the party's statutes.  Meisch was the only candidate put forward to replace her, and recorded a 90% vote in his favour (between him and none of the above), holding the position since 10 October 2004.

The 2005 election to Differdange communal council saw Meisch score an 'historic' victory, in leading the DP to buck the national trend and greatly increase their vote: winning 43% of the vote and winning eight seats.  Meisch thus remained as mayor, heading a coalition with the Greens, although the size of the victory allowed Meisch to choose his coalition partner from any of the other three parties.

In the 2009 legislative election, Meisch was re-elected, winning more votes that any other Democratic candidate in the entire country, and winning more than twice as many votes as Eugène Berger, who placed second on the DP list in Sud.  The party nationwide fell 1.1% of the vote and lost a seat.  Immediately after the election, Meisch ruled out a coalition with the CSV, so the DP continued in opposition.

In 2020, Meisch was at the centre of controversy when, as Minister of Education, he forced the Luxembourgish public schools to reopen in the midst of the COVID-19 pandemic despite protests from the teachers union (SNE) and an online petition from 23,000 concerned parents urging him not to do so. A spokesperson for the Ministry of Education stated that "parents have no say in the matter".

Footnotes

External links

 Chamber of Deputies official website biography

|-

|-

|-

|-

Mayors of places in Luxembourg
Members of the Chamber of Deputies (Luxembourg)
Members of the Chamber of Deputies (Luxembourg) from Sud
Councillors in Differdange
Democratic Party (Luxembourg) politicians
Luxembourgian economists
1971 births
Living people
People from Pétange